Wang Buwen (zh: 王步文, pinyin: Wáng Bùwén) (b. 13 January 1898 - d. 31 May 1931) was a Communist Chinese politician in service during the Republic of China.

Biography 
Wang was born in 1898 in Anqing, Anhui Province during the late Qing Empire. After completing his high school in Anhui, Wang pursued his university studies in Tokyo, Empire of Japan where he joined a Communist Youth Group and began agitating against rival groups run by Fang Chih.

After returning to Anhui in 1927, he became a key figure in the CCP Anhui Provincial Interim Committee. In 1929, he was transferred to serve as the CCP Central Inspector for the province. In 1931, he became a founding member of the CCP's Anhui Provincial Committee as its Deputy Secretary of Propaganda, Chief Minister and Party Secretary

Death 
In April 1931, Wang was swept up in a KMT purge of Anhui's communists started in 1929. He was executed by firing squad at the Anqing Horses Pond Prison on 31 May.

References 

1898 births
1931 deaths
People executed by the Republic of China by firing squad
Republic of China politicians from Anhui
Politicians from Anqing
Chinese Communist Party politicians from Anhui
Executed Republic of China people
Executed people from Anhui